The Redwood National and State Parks (RNSP) are a complex of one national park and three state parks, cooperatively managed and located in the United States along the coast of northern California. Comprising Redwood National Park (established 1968) and California's State Parks: Del Norte Coast, Jedediah Smith, and Prairie Creek (dating from the 1920s), the combined RNSP contain , and feature old-growth temperate rainforests. Located within Del Norte and Humboldt counties, the four parks protect 45 percent of all remaining coast redwood (Sequoia sempervirens) old-growth forests, totaling at least . The species is the tallest, among the oldest, and one of the most massive tree species on Earth.

The northern portion of that area was originally inhabited by Native Americans who were forced out of their land by gold seekers and timber harvesters. The enormous redwoods attracted timber harvesters to support the gold rush in more southern regions of California and the increased population from booming development in San Francisco and other places on the West Coast. After many decades of unrestricted clear-cut logging, serious efforts toward conservation began. By 1918 the work of the Save the Redwoods League, founded to preserve remaining old-growth redwoods, resulted in the establishment of Prairie Creek, Del Norte Coast, and Jedediah Smith Redwoods State Parks among others. The federally managed Redwood National Park was created in 1968, by which time nearly 90 percent of the original redwood trees had been logged. In 1994 the National Park Service (NPS) and the California Department of Parks and Recreation (CDPR) administratively combined Redwood National Park with the three abutting Redwood State Parks as a single unit for the purpose of cooperative forest management and stabilization of forests and watersheds.

The ecosystems of the RNSP preserve a number of threatened animal species such as the tidewater goby, Chinook salmon, northern spotted owl, and Steller's sea lion, though it is believed that the tidewater goby is likely to have been extirpated from the park. In recognition of the rare ecosystem and cultural history found in the parks, the United Nations designated them a World Heritage Site on September 5, 1980. The four redwood parks along with part of the California Coast Ranges were designated an International Biosphere Reserve on June 30, 1983.

History

Modern day native groups such as the Yurok, Tolowa, Karok, Chilula, and Wiyot all have historical ties to the region, and some Native American groups still live in the park area today. Archaeological study shows they arrived in the area as far back as 3,000 years ago. An 1852 census determined that the Yurok were the most numerous, with 55 villages and an estimated population of 2,500. They used the abundant redwood, which with its linear grain was easily split into planks, as a building material for boats, houses, and small villages. For buildings, the planks would be erected side by side in a narrow trench, with the upper portions bound with leather strapping and held by notches cut into the supporting roof beams. Redwood boards were used to form a shallow sloping roof. Until the 1860s, the Chilula lived in the middle region of the Redwood Creek valley in close company with the redwood trees. Two village sites of the Chilula (Howunakut and Noieding), who primarily settled along Redwood Creek in the Bald Hills to Minor Creek, California, are located within the contemporary boundaries of the park.

The relationship between Indigenous groups and the redwoods extends beyond a physical connection. Scholar Gail L. Jenner notes that "their lives were – and are – built on more than just wood, although the redwood was the source of much of their material culture; their lives were enmeshed in the very character and fabric of the trees." As noted by Minnie Reeves, a Chilula tribal elder and religious leader, in 1976, the Chilula are "people from within the redwood tree." Reeves further elaborates that the trees are a gift from the creator as a demonstration of love: "Destroy these trees and you destroy the Creator's love. And if you destroy that which the Creator loves so much, you will eventually destroy mankind." To the Yurok, the trees are sacred living beings which "stand as 'guardians' over sacred places." Indigenous people regard traditional houses made of the redwood trees also as "living beings" since, according to Edwin C. Bearss, "the redwood that formed its planks was itself the body of one of the Spirit Beings," which were considered, in his words, to be a "divine race who existed before humans in the redwood region and who taught people the proper way to live there."

Previous to Jedediah Smith in 1828, no other explorer of European descent is known to have thoroughly investigated the inland region away from the immediate coast. The discovery of gold along the Trinity River in 1850 led to a minor secondary rush in California. This brought miners into the area and many stayed on at the coast after failing to strike it rich. This quickly led to conflicts wherein native peoples were placed under great strain, if not forcibly removed or massacred. By 1895, only one third of the Yurok in one group of villages remained; by 1919, virtually all members of the Chilula tribe had either died or been assimilated into other tribes. The miners logged redwoods for building; when this minor gold rush ended, some of them turned again to logging, cutting down the giant redwood trees. In 1911, U.S. Representative John E. Raker, of California, became the first politician to introduce legislation for the creation of a redwood national park. However, no further action was taken by Congress at that time.

Preservation of the redwood stands in California is considered one of the most substantial conservation contributions of the Boone and Crockett Club. The Save the Redwoods League was founded in 1918 by Boone and Crockett Club members Madison Grant, John C. Merriam, Henry Fairfield Osborn, and future member, Frederick Russell Burnham. The initial purchases of land were made by club member Stephen Mather and William Kent. In 1921, Boone and Crockett Club member John C. Phillips donated $32,000 to purchase land and create the Raynal Bolling Memorial Grove in the Humboldt Redwoods State Park. This was timely as U.S. Route 101, which would soon provide nearly unfettered access to the trees, was under construction. Using matching funds provided initially by the County of Humboldt and later by the State of California, the Save the Redwoods League managed to protect areas of concentrated or multiple redwood groves and a few entire forests in the 1920s. As California created a state park system, beginning in 1927, three of the preserved redwood areas became Prairie Creek Redwoods, Del Norte Coast Redwoods, and Jedediah Smith Redwoods State Parks. A fourth became Humboldt Redwoods State Park, by far the largest of the individual Redwood State Parks, but not in the Redwood National and State Park system. Because of the high demand for lumber during World War II and the construction boom that followed in the 1950s, the creation of a national park was delayed. Efforts by the Save the Redwoods League, the Sierra Club, and the National Geographic Society to create a national park began in the early 1960s.  After intense lobbying of Congress, the bill creating Redwood National Park was signed by President Lyndon B. Johnson on October 2, 1968. 

Amidst both local support of environmentalists and opposition from local loggers and logging companies,  were added to Redwood National Park in a major expansion in 1978. However, only a fifth of that land was old-growth forest, the rest having been logged. This expansion protected the watershed along Redwood Creek from being adversely affected by logging operations outside the park. The federal and state parks were administratively combined in 1994.

Expansion of the national park was controversial because of the impact on the logging community and because most of the parkland was already sustainably managed by the private timber industry with the old-growth within the expanded park already protected. It remains the largest purchase of private land by the Federal Government in history as well as the largest eminent domain action. In 1977, a 25-truck convoy featuring logging equipment crossed the country to deliver President Jimmy Carter a 9-ton peanut carved from old-growth redwood. The president refused the gift, and the Orick Peanut was returned to Orick, a logging town adjacent to the newly-expanded park that saw substantial economic decline in the following decades. 

The United Nations designated Redwood National and State Parks a World Heritage Site on September 5, 1980. The evaluation committee noted 50 prehistoric archaeological sites, spanning 4,500 years. It also cited ongoing research in the park by Humboldt State University researchers, among others. The park is part of a much larger region designated the California Coast Ranges International Biosphere Reserve on June 30, 1983. The California Coast Ranges biosphere is overseen by the University of California Natural Reserve System.

Scenes set on the forest moon Endor in Star Wars Episode VI: Return of the Jedi were filmed on private logging company land that was shortly thereafter clearcut near the town of Smith River, California north of the park and, south of the park, the speeder chase scene at the Chetham Grove section of Grizzly Creek Redwoods State Park.  Scenes for The Lost World: Jurassic Park as well as the movie Outbreak were filmed at the nearby Prairie Creek Redwoods State Park and Sue-meg State Park.

Park management

Redwood National and State Parks consists of Redwood National Park, directly managed by the U.S. Government's National Park Service (NPS) and Jedediah Smith, Del Norte Coast  and Prairie Creek Redwoods State Parks overseen by the California Department of Parks and Recreation (CDPR). They are jointly managed as Redwoods National and State Parks. Redwood National Park headquarters is located in Crescent City, California. There are five visitor and interpretive centers located in or adjacent to the park, including the Hiouchi, Jedediah Smith, Prairie Creek and Thomas H. Kuchel visitor centers as well as the Crescent City Information Center at the park headquarters location.

Natural resources
The Redwood National and State Parks form one of the most significant protected areas of the Northern California coastal forests ecoregion.

Flora
The parks protect  of old-growth forest almost equally divided between federal  and state  management. Redwoods have existed along the coast of northern California for at least 20 million years and are related to tree species that existed 160 million years ago.

The native range of coast redwood is from the northern California coast north to the southern Oregon Coast. The tree is closely related to the giant sequoia of central California, and more distantly to the dawn redwood which is indigenous to the Sichuan–Hubei region of China.

One tree that fell in 1991 was reported to be . Only the giant sequoia has more mass. The largest redwood by volume is the 42,500 cubic foot (1,205 m³) Lost Monarch, located in Jedediah Smith Redwoods State Park. Mature Coast redwoods live an average of 500–700 years and a few are documented to be 2,000 years old, making them some of the longest-living organisms on earth. They are highly resistant to disease, due to a thick protective bark and high tannin content. Redwoods prefer sheltered slopes, slightly inland and near water sources such as rivers and streams.

Redwood trees develop enormous limbs that accumulate deep organic soils and can support tree-sized trunks growing on them. This typically occurs above . Scientists have recently discovered that plants which normally grow on the forest floor also grow in these soils, well above ground. The soil mats provide homes to invertebrates, mollusks, earthworms, and salamanders. During drought seasons, some treetops die back, but the trees do not die outright. Instead, redwoods have developed mechanisms to regrow new trunks from other limbs. These secondary trunks, called reiterations, also develop root systems in the accumulated soils at their bases. This helps transport water to the highest reaches of the trees. Coastal fog also provides up to one-third of their annual water needs.

Sitka spruce are plentiful along the coast and are better adapted to salty air than other species. The evergreen hardwood tanoak produces a nut similar to the acorns produced by the related genus Quercus (oak). Both tanoaks and oaks are members of the beech family. Trees such as the Pacific madrone, bigleaf maple, California laurel, and red alder are also widespread throughout the parks.

Huckleberry, blackberry, and salmonberry are part of the forest understory and provide food for many animal species. The California rhododendron and azalea are flowering shrubs common in the park, especially in old-growth forest. Plants such as the sword fern are prolific, particularly near ample water sources.

Fauna

The ecosystems of the RNSP preserve a number of rare animal species. Numerous ecosystems exist, with seacoast, river, prairie, and densely forested zones all within the park. The  tidewater goby is a federally listed endangered species that live near the Pacific coastline. The bald eagle, which usually nests near a water source, is listed as a state of California endangered species. The Chinook salmon, northern spotted owl, and Steller's sea lion are a few of the other animal species that are threatened.

Over 40 species of mammals have been documented, including the black bear, coyote, cougar, bobcat, beaver, river otter, and black-tailed deer. Roosevelt elk are the most readily observed of the large mammals in the park. Successful herds, brought back from the verge of extinction in the region, are now common in park areas south of the Klamath River. Many smaller mammals live in the high forest canopy. Different species of bats, such as the big brown bat, and other smaller mammals including the red squirrel and northern flying squirrel spend most of their lives well above the forest floor.

Along the coastline, California sea lions, Steller sea lions and harbor seals live near the shore and on seastacks, rocky outcroppings forming small islands just off the coast. Dolphins and Pacific gray whales are occasionally seen offshore. Brown pelicans and double-crested cormorants are mainly found on cliffs along the coast and on seastacks, while sandpipers and gulls inhabit the seacoast and inland areas. Inland, freshwater-dependent birds such as the common merganser, osprey, red-shouldered hawk, great blue heron, and Steller's jay are a few of the bird species that have been documented. At least 400 bird species have been documented in the forestlands.

Reptiles and amphibians can also be found in the parks, with the northwestern ringneck snake, northern red-legged frog, Pacific giant salamander, and the rough-skinned newt most commonly seen.

Invasive species
Currently, over 200 exotic species live in Redwood National and State Parks. Of these, 30 have been identified as invasive species, and ten of the 30 are considered as threats to local species and ecosystems. Exotic species currently account for about a quarter of the total flora in the parks. Only about one percent of plant growth in old-growth areas are of exotic species, while areas such as the Bald Hills prairies have a relative cover of fifty to seventy-five percent exotic. The type of foreign vegetation also varies, with plants such as the English Ivy (Hedera helix), Spotted Knapweed (Centaurea maculosa), and the Poison Hemlock (Conium maculatum). The spotted knapweed and poison hemlock are both under consideration for addition to a high priority watch list maintained by the park system.

Geology

The northern coastal region of California, which includes the RNSP and the adjacent offshore area, is the most seismically active in the U.S. Frequent minor earthquakes in the park and offshore under the Pacific Ocean have resulted in shifting river channels, landslides, and erosion of seaside cliffs. During the 1990s, more than nine magnitude 6.0 earthquakes occurred along this fault zone resulting in 1 death and major financial loss, and there is always potential for a major earthquake. The park ensures that visitors are aware of the potential for a major earthquake through the use of pamphlets and information posted throughout the parks. The threat of a tsunami is of particular concern, and visitors to the seacoast are told to seek higher ground immediately after any significant earthquake.

Both coastline and the Coast Ranges can be found within park boundaries. The majority of the rocks in the parks are part of the Franciscan Assemblage, uplifted from the ocean floor millions of years ago. These sedimentary rocks are primarily sandstone, siltstone, shale, and chert, with lesser amounts of metamorphic rocks such as greenstone. For the most part, these rocks are easily eroded, and can be viewed along the seacoast and where rivers and streams have cut small gorges. Formed during the Cretaceous Period, they are highly deformed from uplift and folding processes. In some areas, river systems have created fluvial deposits of sand, mud, and gravel, which are transported into the park from upstream. Redwood Creek follows the Grogan Fault; along the west bank of the creek, schist and other metamorphic rocks can be found, while sedimentary rocks of the Franciscan Assemblage are located on the east bank.

Climate

The Redwood National and State Parks have an oceanic temperate rainforest climate, with cool-summer Mediterranean characteristics. Weather in the RNSP is greatly influenced by the Pacific Ocean. Coastal temperatures generally range between 40 and 60 degrees Fahrenheit (4–15 °C) all year round, while further from the coast summers are hotter and drier, and winters are colder. In this temperate but humid coastal zone, the trees receive moisture from both heavy winter rains and persistent summer fog. The presence and consistency of the summer fog is actually more important to overall health of the trees than heavy precipitation. This fact is born out in annual precipitation totals, which range between  annually, with healthy redwood forests throughout the areas of less precipitation because excessive needs for water are mitigated by the ever-present summer fog and the cooler temperatures it ensures. Snow is uncommon even on peaks above , further exemplifying the mild, temperate nature of this northern latitude; however, light snow mixed with rain is common during the winter months.

Fire management
Prescribed controlled fires are currently part of the fire management plan and helps to eliminate exotic species of plants and allows a more fertile and natural ecosystem. Fire is also used to protect prairie grasslands and to keep out forest encroachment, ensuring sufficient rangeland for elk and deer. The oak forest regions also benefit from controlled burns, as Douglas fir would otherwise eventually take over and decrease biodiversity. The use of fire in old-growth redwood zones reduces dead and decaying material, and lessens the mortality of larger redwoods by eliminating competing vegetation. In the park, a fire management plan monitors all fires, weather patterns and the fuel load (dead and decaying plant material). This fuel load is removed from areas near structures and where fire poses high risk to the public, and controlled burns are used elsewhere. The National Interagency Fire Center provides additional firefighters and equipment in the event of a large fire.

Recreation

The park has five visitor centers, where general information, maps, and souvenirs are available; some of the centers offer activities during the summer, led by the park rangers. There is no entry fee for the RNSP, though some camping areas and park areas require paid passes.

Since the late-2019 closure of the DeMartin Redwood Youth Hostel, a low-amenities shared lodging facility (near Klamath), there are no hotels or motels within the parks' boundaries. However, nearby towns such as Klamath, Requa, and Orick provide small hotels and inns, with extensive lodging options available in the regional trading centers: Crescent City on the northern end of the park and Arcata and Eureka located to the south. The Smith River National Recreation Area, part of the Six Rivers National Forest, is adjacent to the north end of the RNSP.

The state parks have four frontcountry campgrounds which can be accessed by vehicle and used for a fee; the parks' website suggests making a reservation. These are at Mill Creek campground in Del Norte Coast Redwoods State Park and Jedediah Smith campground in Jedediah Smith Redwoods State Park, which together have 251 campsites; the Elk Prairie campground in Prairie Creek Redwoods State Park, which has 75; and the Gold Bluffs Beach campground which has 26. Other nearby parks and recreation areas have additional camping options.

Hiking is the only way to reach the seven backcountry camping areas, the use of which requires a permit. Camping is only allowed in designated sites, except on gravel bars along Redwood Creek that allow for dispersed camping. Proper food storage to minimize encounters with bears is strongly enforced, and hikers and backpackers are required to take out any trash they generate.

Almost  of hiking trails exist in the parks. Throughout the year, trails are often wet and hikers need to be well prepared for rainy weather and consult information centers for updates on trail conditions. Some temporary footbridges are removed during the rainy season, as they would be destroyed by high streams.

Horseback riding and mountain biking are allowed on certain trails. Kayaking is permitted, with ranger-led kayak tours offered during the summer. Kayakers and canoeists frequently travel the Smith River, which is the longest undammed river remaining in California. Visitors can fish for salmon and troutin the Smith and Klamath rivers, and the beach areas offer opportunities to catch smelt and perch. A California sport fishing license is required to fish any of the rivers and streams.

See also 
 Redwoods State Parks:
 Del Norte Coast Redwoods State Park
 Jedediah Smith Redwoods State Park
 Prairie Creek Redwoods State Park
 National parks in California
 List of national parks of the United States
 Lost Man Creek Dam

Notes

References

 Retrieved in 2006.
 Retrieved in 2006.

External links

  of the Redwood National Park, National Park Service (NPS)
 Official website Jedediah Smith Redwoods State Park
 Official website Humboldt Redwoods State Park
 Official website Prairie Creek Redwoods State Park
 Humboldt Redwoods Project - Museum and Gallery Practices Certificate Program, Humboldt State University via: Omeka
 Willard E. Pratt. Chronology: Establishment of the Redwood National Park - Forest History Society
 Inventory of the Redwood National Park Collection, 1926-1980 - Forest History Society

 
National parks in California
State parks of California
Coast redwood groves
Old-growth forests
Parks in Del Norte County, California
Parks in Humboldt County, California
Beaches of Del Norte County, California
Protected areas established in 1968
1968 establishments in California
World Heritage Sites in the United States
Beaches of Northern California
Temperate rainforests